Bernard II, Duke of Brunswick-Lüneburg, (about 1437 – 1464) was the Bishop of Hildesheim (as Bernard III) from 1452 to 1457, as well as Prince of Lüneburg from 1457 to 1464.

Life 

Bernard was the son of Frederick the Pious and his wife Magdalene of Brandenburg. In 1452, Bernard was elected at the request of the Bishop of Hildesheim to be his coadjutor and later became his successor when the bishop died. However, the bishop's aspiration that in selecting a Welf the bishopric would strengthen its position vis-a-vis the Welf Principality of Brunswick-Wolfenbüttel proved elusive because Bernard felt obliged to support the interests of his family first. At the request of his father, he left the bishopric in 1457 to take over the Principality of Lüneburg, which he ruled jointly with his brother, Otto the Victorious, until his death on 9 Feb 1464. He married Matilda of Holstein-Schauenburg, daughter of Otto II, Count of Schauenburg-Pinneberg, in 1463, but the marriage was childless. Matilda went on to be the second wife of William the Victorious, Duke of Brunswick-Lüneburg.

Ancestors

See also 
 Duchy of Brunswick-Lüneburg
 Principality of Lüneburg
 Prince-Bishopric of Hildesheim

References

Sources 
 Die Diözese Hildesheim. In Vergangenheit und Gegenwart von Thomas Scharf-Wrede 
 Geckler, Christa (1986). Die Celler Herzöge: Leben und Wirken 1371–1705. Celle: Georg Ströher. . .

External links 
 The House of Welf
 Bishopric of Hildesheim

15th-century German Roman Catholic bishops
Princes of Lüneburg
Prince-Bishops of Hildesheim
1437 births
1464 deaths
Middle House of Lüneburg